Carper is a surname. Notable people with the surname include:

Jean Carper (born 1932), American medical journalist
Tom Carper (born 1947), American economist and politician, Governor and Senator from Delaware

See also
Comprehensive Agrarian Reform Program Extension with Reforms or CARP Extension with Reforms, a program of land reform in the Philippines enacted in 2009